Henri Chazé (23 February 1904, in Chazé-Henry – 1984)  was a French communist.

He was born Gaston Davoust in Chazé-Henry, whose name he reversed to form his pseudonym. His father, Eugène Davoust, was an anarchist railway worker active in his union. He was an advocate of the general strike as advocated by Émile Pouget. When Henri was six his father participated in a major strike by railway workers for weekly rest periods and a better pension. The strike was broken by troops taking over the depots and Eugène was sacked. The family was thrown on hard times and survived by his mother making corsets.

His father was also an ardent freemason, as was his grandfather and his brother, all affiliated to the Grand Orient of France. However Henri found the initiation rituals degrading and the environment an example of the sort of organisation where men drawn from all sorts of classes would mix, creating opportunities for both the socially ambitious and spies of the Deuxième Bureau.

Union Communiste

He was a founder member of Union Communiste in 1933 and became the editor of their journal L'Internationale.

Works
 Pannekoek et les Conseils ouvriers (1962)
 La Révolution et la Guerre d’Espagne (1970)
 H. Chazé, Chronique de la Révolution espagnole, Union communiste (1933-1939), éditions Spartacus, Paris, 1979.
 Militantisme et responsabilité, Echanges et mouvement, Paris 2004. Présentation d'Henri Simon, texte et en annexe « Le crime des bagnes nazis : le peuple allemand est-il coresponsable ?. Extrait en ligne
 Gaston Davoust (H. Chazé): Le crime des bagnes nazis : le peuple allemand est-il coresponsable ? (Chazé, 1945), Franche-Comté Libération, 1945.

References

1904 births
1984 deaths
French communists